Karahal Kalan is a village in Kapurthala district of Punjab State, India. The village is administrated by a Sarpanch, who is an elected representative.

Demography 
According to the report published by Census India in 2011, Karahal Kalan has 153 houses with the total population of 801, of which 395 are male and 406 females. The literacy rate of Karahal Kalan is 73.74%, lower than the state average of 75.84%.  The population of children in the age group 0–6 years is 104, which is 12.98% of the total population. Child sex ratio is approximately 857, higher than the state average of 846.

Population data

References

External links
  Villages in Kapurthala
 Kapurthala Villages List

Villages in Kapurthala district